Interactive learning is a pedagogical approach that incorporates social networking and urban computing into course design and delivery.  Interactive learning has evolved out of the hyper-growth in the use of digital technology and virtual communication, particularly by students. The use of digital media in education has led to an increase in the use of and reliance on interactive learning, which in turn has led to a revolution in the fundamental process of education.

Increasingly, students and teachers rely on each other to access sources of knowledge and share their information, expanding the general scope of the educational process to include not just instruction, but the expansion of knowledge.  The role change from keeper of knowledge to facilitator of learning presents a challenge and an opportunity for educators to dramatically, change the way their students learn.  The boundaries between teacher and student have less meaning with interactive learning.

Paradigm shifts in education
Interactivity as a pedagogical technique requires a fundamental change in the way education is delivered.  Tapscott  has identified 7 ways this change occurs:
From linear to hypermedia learning.
From the teacher as transmitter to the teacher as facilitator.

Components of interactive learning

Social media
The socialization of education is evolving in the form of personalized digital media sources. Web logs, or blogs, enable students to express thoughts and ideas individually, while at the same time sharing them with the larger community. The pervasiveness of social networks like MySpace and Facebook connect millions of learners to a virtual community where information is exchanged laterally between and among students and teachers alike. This explosion of community is contributing to an expanding learning economy, where participants have unparalleled access to knowledge, both from teachers and other students.

Urban computing
This set of technologies includes the use of wireless networks, smart phones and PDAs, search engines, and location-based media.  Urban computing allows enhanced interactivity between people and their environment through the use of these technologies. For interactive learning, this means that students are able to assimilate knowledge specific to their location.

Serious games
The concept of serious games involves immersing students in virtual worlds by means of role-playing and community interactive games.  For learning, this means that the cooperative, critical-thinking, and problem-solving practices encouraged in digital games make serious games a key form of pedagogy. Adapting gaming as a form of experiential learning brings real-world issues into education within the structure of a planned curriculum.  Along with their intrinsically engaging properties, games have been touted for their ability to teach ill-defined problem-solving skills, elicit creativity, and develop leadership, collaboration, and other valuable interpersonal skills.

Applying interactive learning
In order to be effective, learning institutions must see computers and associated technology as an essential part of the student.  In other words, technology must be seen as cognitive prosthetics. The core concept of distance education is that the real world becomes the learning environment; in this environment, the purpose of the instructor is to help facilitate the absorption of knowledge through both real-world and virtual learning experiences.  Historically, one of the obstacles to distance education is the lack of face to face contact.  The use of technology as an integral part of course design has attempted to compensate in both synchronous and asynchronous settings.

For delivery of synchronous content, technologies such as videoconferencing and web conferencing are typically used.  An example of this is the growing use of Skype and GoToMeeting for virtual class discussions and lectures. For asynchronous content delivery, course designers use a variety of software suites that include various types of interactive elements. Programs such as WebCT, Knowledge Forum, FirstClass and Blackboard Learning System attempt to ameliorate the lack of contact with online discussion forums and bulletin boards.

See also
E-learning
MOOCs

References 

Teaching
Interactive media